The 1988 360 km of Jarama was the second round of the 1988 World Sportscar Championship season.  It took place at Circuito Permanente Del Jarama, Spain on March 13, 1988.

Official results
Class winners in bold.  Cars failing to complete 75% of the winner's distance marked as Not Classified (NC).

Statistics
 Pole Position - #61 Team Sauber Mercedes - 1:14.350
 Fastest Lap - #61 Team Sauber Mercedes - 1:18.464
 Average Speed - 144.325 km/h

References

 
 

J
1000 km Jarama
Jarama 360